Dr. Ahmed Kamal (born 5 April 1956 in Hyderabad, Telangana) better known as Ahmed Kamal is the first Pro-Vice Chancellor of Jamia Hamdard since 2017, a Scientist at the Indian Institute of Chemical Technology (IICT), Hyderabad and a former visiting scientist at the University of Alberta, Edmonton, Canada. He is also a Fellow of National Academy of Sciences, India and Royal Society of Chemistry.

Education and research
Ahmed Kamal is a graduate of Osmania University, Hyderabad (India) from where he obtained his Master's degree in Organic Chemistry. He did his Ph.D. in the area of Medicinal Chemistry from the Aligarh Muslim University.

He is the author of several research papers.

References 

1956 births
Living people
Osmania University alumni
Aligarh Muslim University alumni